Guinn Terrell Williams Jr. (April 26, 1899 – June 6, 1962) was an American actor who appeared in memorable westerns such as Dodge City (1939), Santa Fe Trail (1940), and The Comancheros (1961). He was nicknamed "Big Boy" as he was 6' 2" and had a muscular build from years of working on ranches and playing semi-pro and professional baseball, and at the height of his movie career was frequently billed above the title simply as Big Boy Williams or as "Big Boy" Guinn Williams on posters and in the film itself.

Biography
His father, Guinn Williams (1871–1948), a Democratic congressman, represented the 13th Texas Congressional District in the United States House of Representatives from 1922 to 1932. When Williams Jr. returned from World War I as an Army officer, he found out his father had secured for him an appointment to West Point that Williams Jr. saw no need to attend after his war service; he decided to become a baseball player instead. He was introduced by Will Rogers into motion pictures and polo, where he became a champion player and was given the name "Big Boy" by Rogers.

Williams made his screen debut in the 1919 comedy, Almost A Husband, with Will Rogers and Cullen Landis, was the titular leading man to singing comedienne Fannie Brice in My Man (1928), and was featured in a large supporting role in Frank Borzage's Lucky Star (1929) with Janet Gaynor and Charles Farrell. Throughout the 1920s, Williams would have a string of successful films, mostly Westerns in which he wore a ten gallon hat.

He then appeared in The Great Meadow alongside Johnny Mack Brown, which was Brown's breakout film. Throughout the 1930s, Williams acted in supporting roles, mostly in westerns, sports, or outdoor dramas. He was always employed, and was successful as both a B picture leading man and a supporting actor in A pictures. He often played alongside Hoot Gibson and Harry Carey during that period. In 1944, he was cast in a large role as sidekick to Robert Mitchum in Mitchum's first leading role (billed as "Introducing Bob Mitchum") in Zane Grey's Nevada, a remake of a 1927 film starring Gary Cooper.  In 1941, he became one of many actors cast by Universal Pictures in their large film serial, Riders of Death Valley. From the late 1930s to the mid-1940s, Williams appeared in supporting roles in a number of A-pictures, sometimes with high billing, such as You Only Live Once, and in Columbia's first Technicolor film, The Desperadoes (1943).

Williams was frequently teamed with Alan Hale as sidekicks to Errol Flynn in several of his pictures. In 1960, he was cast in the epic film The Alamo and in Home from the Hill with Robert Mitchum. His last role was opposite his close friend John Wayne and Stuart Whitman in The Comancheros.

On television, he appeared in the Western series Gunsmoke as Groat, a gruff, bully cowboy in the 1957 episode “Skid Row” (S2E22).

Personal life
In the 1920s, he had an affair with Mary Philbin while she was engaged to Paul Kohner.

He was married to three actresses, the first being silent film actress Kathleen Collins. For a time, he was married to B-movie actress Barbara Weeks. His last wife was Dorothy Peterson, whom he first met in the 1940s. Prior to meeting her he had been engaged to Lupe Vélez but she broke off the engagement at their friend Errol Flynn's home by breaking a framed portrait of Williams over his head and then urinating on the picture.

Like his father, Williams was active in an array of notable and state related causes. He worked with the regional Agricultural Credit Association, The Production Credit Corporation, The Goat Raisers Association, The Texas Wool and Mohair Company, and the Bankers Association (all of which coincided both in his native Texas and adopted California). 

Throughout his life Williams was active both in community affairs and the Methodist churches of Decatur, Texas, San Angelo, Texas, and Los Angeles, California.

Williams died unexpectedly of uremic poisoning on June 6, 1962, aged 63. Williams was interred in the Enduring Faith section at Hollywood Hills of Los Angeles.

Filmography

 Almost a Husband (1919)
 Jubilo (1919) – Man Shooting Pool with Bert
 Cupid the Cowpuncher (1920) – Hairoil Johnson
 Godless Men (1920) – Seaman
 The Vengeance Trail (1921) – Big Boy Bronson
 Western Firebrands (1921) – Billy Fargo
 Across the Border (1922) – Andy Fowler
 Rounding Up the Law (1922) – Larry Connell
 The Cowboy King (1922) – Dud Smiley
 Remembrance (1922)
 The Trail of Hate (1922) – Silent Kerry
Blaze Away (1922) – Big Boy
 The Freshie (1922) – Charles Taylor
 Cyclone Jones (1923) – Cyclone Jones
 Riders at Night (1923)
 End of the Rope (1923)
 $1,000 Reward (1923)
 The Avenger (1924) – Nat Sherwood
 The Eagle's Claw (1924) – Dan Carson
 Red Blood and Blue (1925) – Tom Butler
 Fangs of Wolfheart (1925)
 Wolfheart's Revenge (1925) – Jack Stanley
 Sporting West (1925)
 Black Cyclone (1925) – Jim Lawson
 Whistling Jim (1925) – Whistling Jim
 Rose of the Desert (1925)
 Riders of the Sand Storm (1925) – The Cowboy
 Courage of Wolfheart (1925)
 The Big Stunt (1925)
 Brown of Harvard (1926) – Hal Walters
 The Desert's Toll (1926)
 Quarantined Rivals (1927) – Joe, the plumber
 Slide, Kelly, Slide (1927) – McLean
 Backstage (1927) – Mike Donovan
 Arizona Bound (1927) – Cowboy
 Snowbound (1927) – Bull Morgan
 Babe Comes Home (1927) – Baseball Player
 The Woman Who Did Not Care (1927) – Lars
 Lightning (1927) – Cuth Stewart
 The Down Grade (1927) – Ed Holden
 The College Widow (1927) – Don White
 Burning Daylight (1928) – English Harry
 Ladies' Night in a Turkish Bath (1928) – Sweeney
 Vamping Venus (1928) – Mars
 Beggars of Life (1928) – Baker's Cart Driver
 Noah's Ark (1928) – Al / Ham
 My Man (1928) – Joe Halsey
 From Headquarters (1929) – Gunnery Sgt. Wilmer
 Lucky Star (1929) – Sgt. Martin Wrenn
 The Forward Pass (1929) – Honey Smith
 City Girl (1930) – Reaper
 The Big Fight (1930) – Tiger
 The Bad Man (1930) – Red Giddings
 Liliom (1930) – Hollinger
 College Lovers (1930) – Tiny Courtley
 The Bachelor Father (1931) – Richard 'Dick' Berney
 The Great Meadow (1931) – Rubin Hall
 The Phantom (1931) – Dick Mallory
 Ladies of the Jury (1932) – Steve Bromm
 Polly of the Circus (1932) – Eric
 Drifting Souls (1932) – Bing
 70,000 Witnesses (1932) – Connors
 Heritage of the Desert (1932) – Lefty – Henchman
 You Said a Mouthful (1932) – Joe Holt, a Swimming Champion
 The Devil Is Driving (1932) – Mac
 The Phantom Broadcast (1933) – Sandy Higgins
 Laughing at Life (1933) – Jones
 Man of the Forest (1933) – Big Boy
 Rafter Romance (1933) – Fritzie
 College Coach (1933) – Matthews
 The Mystery Squadron (1933, Serial) – Bill 'Jellybean' Cook
 Palooka (1934) – Slats
 Cheaters (1934) – Detective Sweeney
 Half a Sinner (1934) – 'Bull' Moran
 Here Comes the Navy (1934) – Dance-Floor Manager
 Romance in the Rain (1934) – Panya Mankiewicz
 Thunder Over Texas (1934) – Ted Wright
 Flirtation Walk (1934) – 'Sleepy'
 Cowboy Holiday (1934) – Buck Sawyer
 The Silver Streak (1934) – Higgins
 Big Boy Rides Again (1935) – Tom Duncan
 Private Worlds (1935) – Jerry
 One in a Million (1935) – Spike McGafferty
 Village Tale (1935) – Ben Roberts
 The Glass Key (1935) – Jeff
 Society Fever (1935) – Edgar Prouty
 Danger Trails (1935) – Bob Wilson
 Here Comes Cookie (1935) – Big Boy
 Powdersmoke Range (1935) – Lullaby Joslin
 Gun Play (1935) – Bill Williams
 The Law of 45's (1935) – Tucson Smith
 Miss Pacific Fleet (1935) – Nicholas 'Nick', Annie's Boyfriend
 The Littlest Rebel (1935) – Sgt. Dudley
 Muss 'em Up (1936) – 'Red' Cable
 Kelly the Second (1936) – Cecil Callahan
 Grand Jury (1936) – Joseph Britt
 The Vigilantes Are Coming (1936, Serial) – Salvation
 The Big Game (1936) – Pete Jenkins
 End of the Trail (1936) – Bob Hildreth
 North of Nome (1936) – Haage
 Career Woman (1936) – Bede Sanders
 You Only Live Once (1937) – Roger
 Don't Tell the Wife (1937) – Lazarus Hubert Gregory 'Cupid' Dougal
 A Star Is Born (1937) – Posture Coach
 Dangerous Holiday (1937) – Duke Edwards
 Girls Can Play (1937) – Lieutenant Flannigan
 Flying Fists (1937) – Slug Cassidy
 The Singing Marine (1937) – Dopey
 She's No Lady (1937) – Jeff
 Big City (1937) – Danny Devlin
 My Dear Miss Aldrich (1937) – An Attendant
 Wise Girl (1937) – Mike
 The Bad Man of Brimstone (1937) – 'Vulch' McCreedy
 Everybody's Doing It (1938) – 'Softy' Blane
 You and Me (1938) – Taxi
 The Marines Are Here (1938) – Sgt. Gibbons
 Crashing Through Danger (1938) – Slim
 Professor Beware (1938) – Motorcycle Cop
 Army Girl (1938) – Sgt. Harry Ross
 Hold That Co-ed (1938) – Mike
 Down in 'Arkansaw' (1938) – Juble Butler
 I Demand Payment (1938) – Happy Crofton
 Pardon Our Nerve (1939) – Samson Smith
 Dodge City (1939) – Tex Baird
 Street of Missing Men (1939) – T-Bone
 6,000 Enemies (1939) – Maxie
 Mutiny on the Blackhawk (1939) – Blake – the First Mate
 Bad Lands (1939) – Billy Sweet
 Fugitive at Large (1939) – Conway
 Blackmail (1939) – Moose McCarthy
 Legion of Lost Flyers (1939) – Jake Halley
 The Fighting 69th (1940) – Paddy Dolan
 Castle on the Hudson (1940) – Mike Cagle
 Virginia City (1940) – 'Marblehead'
 Alias the Deacon (1940) – Bull Gumbatz
 Wagons Westward (1940) – Jake Hardman
 Money and the Woman (1940) – Mr. Adler, the Bank Guard
 Dulcy (1940) – Henry
 Santa Fe Trail (1940) – Windy Brody
 Six Lessons from Madame La Zonga (1941) – Alvin
 Country Fair (1941) – Gunther Potts
 Billy the Kid (1941) – Ed Bronson
 Riders of Death Valley (1941, Serial) – Borax Bill
 You'll Never Get Rich (1941) – Kewpie Blain
 Swamp Water (1941) – Bud Dorson 
 Mr. Bug Goes to Town (1941) – Narrator
 The Bugle Sounds (1942) – Sgt. Krims
 Mr. Wise Guy (1942) – Luke Manning
 Lure of the Islands (1942) – Jinx
 Between Us Girls (1942) – Father of the Boys
 Silver Queen (1942) – Blackie
 American Empire (1942) – Sailaway
 The Desperadoes (1943) – Nitro Rankin
 Minesweeper (1943) – CPO Ichabod Ferdinand 'Fixit' Smith
 Hands Across the Border (1944) – Teddy Bear
 Cowboy Canteen (1944) – Spud Harrigan
 Cowboy and the Senorita (1944) – Teddy Bear
 Nevada (1944) – Dusty
 Belle of the Yukon (1944) – Sheriff Mervin Maitland
 Sing Me a Song of Texas (1945) – Big Boy
 The Man Who Walked Alone (1945) – Champ
 Rhythm Round-Up (1945) – Zeke Winslow
 Song of the Prairie (1945) – Big Boy Jackson
 Throw a Saddle on a Star (1946) – Big Boy
 That Texas Jamboree (1946) – Big Boy Frazer
 Cowboy Blues (1946) – Big Boy
 Singing on the Trail (1946) – Big Boy Webster
 Singin' in the Corn (1946) – Hank
 Over the Santa Fe Trail (1947) – Big Boy Jackson
 King of the Wild Horses (1947) – Jed Acker
 Smoky River Serenade (1947) – Wagon Wheel
 Road to the Big House (1947) – Butch McQuinn
 Station West (1948) – Mick
 Smoky Mountain Melody (1948) – Saddle Grease Williams
 Bad Men of Tombstone (1949) – Red Fisk
 Brimstone (1949) – Deputy Art Benson
 Hoedown (1950) – Small Potatoes
 Rocky Mountain (1950) – Pap Dennison
 Al Jennings of Oklahoma (1951) – Lon Tuttle
 Man in the Saddle (1951) – Bourke Prine
 Springfield Rifle (1952) – Sgt. Snow
 Hangman's Knot (1952) – Smitty
 Southwest Passage (1954) – Tall Tale
 Massacre Canyon (1954) – Private Peaceful Allen
 The Outlaw's Daughter (1954) – Moose, Deputy
 Hidden Guns (1956) – Kingford
 Man from Del Rio (1956) – Fred Jasper
 The Hired Gun (1957) – Elby Kirby
 The Restless Gun (1959) - Episode "A Trial for Jenny May"
 Home from the Hill (1960) – Hugh Macauley
 Five Bold Women (1960) – Big Foot
 The Alamo (1960) – Lt. 'Irish' Finn
 The Comancheros (1961) – Ed McBain – Gunrunner

Television

 My Friend Flicka (1955–1956) – Jeb Taylor 
 Circus Boy (1956–1957) – Pete, the Canvasman 
 Gunsmoke (1957) – Groat  
 Cheyenne (1957) – Prairie Dog 
 Sugarfoot (1958) – Moose McKlintock 
 The Adventures of Rin Tin Tin (1958) – Sgt. Muldoon 
 Tales of Wells Fargo (1958) – Mike Forbes
 Wagon Train (1959) – Calvin Bryngelson
 The Restless Gun (1959) – Jeff Bonsell 
 The Magical World of Disney (1960) – Buffalo

References

External links

 
 
 Guinn "Big Boy" Williams full biography
 

1899 births
1962 deaths
20th-century American male actors
Methodists from Texas
American male film actors
American male silent film actors
Burials at Forest Lawn Memorial Park (Hollywood Hills)
California Democrats
Deaths from urologic disease
Male Western (genre) film actors
Male actors from Texas
People from Decatur, Texas
Texas Democrats
United States Army officers
United States Army personnel of World War I